Odd Mob (sometimes stylised as ODD MOB) is an alias of DJ/producer Harry Hope from Brisbane, Australia, formerly a duo consisting of Hope and Robbie Jacobs. Odd Mob is most well known for the viral hit "Is It a Banger?", which placed at number 70 in the 2014 Triple J Hottest 100, and "Into You" featuring fellow Aussie singer/songwriter Starley, which topped the ARIA Club Tracks chart for 7 weeks.

Career
Odd Mob released their first single "The Tribe" in 2013, which was followed by "Jungla" in 2014. In September 2014, Odd Mob released "Is It a Banger?" which became a viral hit and placed in the Triple J Hottest 100, 2014.

In October 2015, Odd Mob released their debut EP, titled Diverse Universe.

In 2017, Robbie left the band and Harry continued Odd Mob as a solo project.

Discography

Extended plays

Singles

Awards and nominations

AIR Awards
The Australian Independent Record Awards (commonly known informally as AIR Awards) is an annual awards night to recognise, promote and celebrate the success of Australia's Independent Music sector.

|-
| AIR Awards of 2019
|"Intrinsic"
| Best Independent Dance, Electronica Or Club Single
| 
|-

References

Australian electronic music groups
Electronic music duos
Musical groups established in 2014
Club DJs
2014 establishments in Australia